Wyee railway station is located on the Main Northern line in New South Wales, Australia. It serves the City of Lake Macquarie town of Wyee opening on 1 August 1892.

Until the early 2000s, two sidings were located to the west of the station to serve a cement works just north of the station. Another siding was located to the east of the station. All have been removed.

In August 2020 an upgrade was complete which included three new lifts.

Platforms & services
Wyee has one island platform with two faces. It is serviced by NSW TrainLink Central Coast & Newcastle Line services travelling from Sydney Central to Newcastle.

Transport links
Busways operates three routes via Wyee station:
95X: to Lake Haven
96: to Budgewoi
97: Lake Haven to Mannering Park

Coastal Liner operate two routes via Wyee station:
10: Westfield Tuggerah to Warnervale
281: Lake Haven to Wangi Wangi

References

External links

Wyee station details Transport for New South Wales

Easy Access railway stations in New South Wales
City of Lake Macquarie
Transport on the Central Coast (New South Wales)
Railway stations in Australia opened in 1892
Regional railway stations in New South Wales
Short-platform railway stations in New South Wales, 4 cars
Main North railway line, New South Wales